Christiaan Hendrik Massyn (born ) is a South African rugby union player for the  in the Pro14. His regular position is flank.

References

Alumni of Monument High School
South African rugby union players
Living people
1994 births
People from Krugersdorp
Rugby union flankers
Blue Bulls players
Boland Cavaliers players
Western Province (rugby union) players
Rugby union players from Gauteng
Stormers players
Cheetahs (rugby union) players
Free State Cheetahs players